The Trentham Mausoleum is a Grade I listed mausoleum in Trentham, Stoke-on-Trent, built as the final resting place of the Dukes of Sutherland.

History
The mausoleum was built in 1807–08 for George Leveson-Gower, the 2nd Marquess of Stafford and later 1st Duke of Sutherland by architect Charles Heathcote Tatham.  Heathcote Tatham was a friend of Elizabeth, the Duke's wife, and along with his commission he constructed several buildings, including a lodge and bridges, at the nearby Trentham Hall.

Architecture
The mausoleum is constructed in ashlar in a neo-classical style with Egyptian details. The corners of the building feature striped Greaco-Egyptian pylon-like structures, which may have been influenced by Heathcote Tatum's time in Paris, where the style was particularly popular in the late 18th century. The entrance doorway is relatively small with doors decorated in highly ornate wrought-iron work and a heavy stone lintel. The mausoleum is surmounted by a small tower, with  louvred windows and a pyramidal roof.

Above the doorway is the family coat of arms and the inscription "MDCCCVIII", signifying the completion date of 1808.

Conservation
The condition of the building has given cause for concern, and although some urgent repairs have been completed,  it is on the Heritage at Risk Register.

See also
 Grade I listed buildings in Staffordshire

References

External links
 Website of Potteries.org – Neville Malkin's "Grand Tour" of the Potteries Retrieved Feb 2017 Has several old pictures, drawings and historical narrative about the Sutherland Mausoleum, Trentham

Grade I listed buildings in Staffordshire
Mausoleums in England
Buildings and structures in Stoke-on-Trent
Monuments and memorials in Staffordshire
Structures on the Heritage at Risk register in Staffordshire